Tali Mendelberg (born 1964) is the John Work Garrett Professor in Politics at Princeton University, and winner of the American Political Science Association (APSA), 2002 Woodrow Wilson Foundation Book Award for her book, The Race Card: Campaign Strategy, Implicit Messages, and the Norm of Equality.

Education 
Mendelberg gained her degree from the University of Wisconsin in 1985, and her PhD in political science from the University of Michigan in 1994.

Awards and honors 
 2002 Woodrow Wilson Foundation Book Award from (APSA)
 2014 Paul Lazarsfeld Best Paper Award: Political Communication Section from APSA
 2012 Best Paper Award: Political Psychology Section from APSA (with Christopher Karpowitz)
 2014 Best Paper Award: Political Psychology Section from APSA
Member of the American Academy of Arts and Sciences, elected 2018

Bibliography

Gender and deliberation 
 
  Pdf.
 
 
  Pdf.
  Pdf.
  Pdf.
  Pdf.

Deliberative politics 
  Pdf.
 
  Pdf.
 
  Pdf.
  Pdf.

Racial Attitudes 
  Pdf.
  Pdf.
 
  Pdf.
  Pdf.
  
  Pdf.
  Pdf.
  Pdf.
  Pdf.
  Pdf.
  Pdf.

Political Psychology 
  Pdf.

Class Inequality in College 
  Pdf.

Further reading

See also 
Deliberative democracy
Feminist philosophy
Feminist theory
Political philosophy

References

External links 
 Profile page: Tali Mendelberg, Department of Politics, Princeton University.

American philosophers
American political scientists
1963 births
Living people
Place of birth missing (living people)
Princeton University faculty
University of Michigan alumni
University of Wisconsin–Madison alumni
Women political scientists